Denim on Denim may refer to:

Denim on Denim (song), a 2018 by Tebey
Denim on Denim (album), a 2010 album by Library Voices